Scott Roy Welch (born 21 April 1968) is a retired British professional boxer. As an amateur, Welch became one of the ABA champions at heavyweight. He travelled the world as a professional boxer, winning the Southern Area belt, the British, Commonwealth and WBO Intercontinental titles. In 1997, he contended the WBO World Title fight in Nashville, losing to Henry Akinwande by a wide points margin. In the course of his career Welch had 26 professional fights, with 22 wins and an impressive 17 knock-outs.

Amateur career
Welch's formative years were spent in the seaside resort of Great Yarmouth. Welch got into boxing at a local club. Welch moved to Brighton when he was 16 and found it "a massive wow factor after Yarmouth." At , he was too big to find a match on the amateur circuit. It took a couple more years, and some intensive coaching at the Hove ABC (Amateur Boxing Club) under Dave Brown, before his amateur career started. Over the next few years, Welch racked up an impressive amateur record of 30 wins against 8 defeats (5 of which he later reversed), culminating in the ABA Heavyweight title of Great Britain in May 1992. "In amateur boxing, every fight was a tough fight as we were all so well matched," Welch remembers.

Personal life
Still a fitness fanatic, Welch has raised huge sums for charity, completing the gruelling 250-mile Marathon des Sables in the Sahara, climbing Kilimanjaro and has tackled the Atacama desert. Welch is Head Trainer at the Brighton and Hove ABC, working alongside his old coach Dave Brown. "I really enjoy it," he says, "I'm putting it all back in. We've got a few good prospects, and there's a lot of younger lads coming through, too". iBoxing Trainer is Welch's smartphone app designed to help youngsters get into boxing and is approved by the World Boxing Council and the British Boxing Board of Control. By keeping things simple but comprehensive, Welch covers everything an aspiring boxer needs to get started and progress. "Learning the basics properly is vital. I wish I had something like this when I first started".

Welch is proud of his work with young boxers and has been recognised for his efforts with a WBC honorary belt. Welch purchased and restored Thorington Gate Lodge in Suffolk, which had been derelict for 20 years. The project was featured on the television series The Restoration Man in 2010.

Other ventures
Since his retirement in 1999, Welch has worked alongside his old coach Dave Brown, as head trainer at the Brighton and Hove  ABC. In Guy Ritchie's bare-knuckle movie Snatch (2000) Welch played Horace 'Good Night' Anderson. His big fight scene with Brad Pitt has achieved notoriety, famously sending Pitt skyward a round before being 'knocked out'. Welch takes his acting fame with a big pinch of salt: "A film star lifestyle would be great if I hadn't done anything in my life, but I'm very pleased with what I've achieved. I've had my career. My career was boxing."

Professional boxing record

References

External links 

1968 births
Living people
English male boxers
Heavyweight boxers
Sportspeople from Great Yarmouth